Tantur Ecumenical Institute is an international ecumenical institute for advanced theological research in Jerusalem.

Goals and objectives
"No one climbs up to Tantur except to follow a vocation, the same vocation that led on the pioneers of ecumenism. That is the climate in which the research here must develop." 
(Albert Outler, Tantur, 1972)

The mission of the Tantur Ecumenical Institute is to:	
 To work toward the unity of Christians (ecumenism);   
 To contribute to positive relations between peoples of the Abrahamic faiths (interreligious dialogue);   
 To be agent for the reconciliation of peoples in conflict (peacebuilding, especially with respect to the Arab-Israeli Conflict/Israeli-Palestinian Conflict).

While the ecumenical mission of Christian unity is the central and core mission of Tantur, its situation in between Jerusalem and Bethlehem give easy context for the second-tier mission areas of interreligious dialogue and peacebuilding. Tantur is as a place and resource for global ecumenical research, as well as for local initiatives in these areas.

In anticipation of the 50th anniversary of the lease and groundbreaking for the institute (1967), the international advisory board developed a new strategic plan for Tantur, which identified the following strategic goals:

 To once again become an internationally recognized galvanizing force for scholarship and dialogue on themes related to Christian unity.
 Embed Tantur more deeply into the academic and scholarly enterprise of the University of Notre Dame.
 Cultivate a commitment to spiritual ecumenism and a culture of encounter among pastoral leaders.

History
Meetings between Protestant observers at Vatican II with Pope Paul VI, and a subsequent meeting between the pope and Patriarch Athenagoras I in Jerusalem, led to the establishment of the Tantur Ecumenical Institute. The property is owned by the Holy See and leased to the University of Notre Dame. It is governed by an international ecumenical board, including Catholic, Orthodox, Protestant and Anglican members.

The institute is located on a 36 acre hill overlooking the road from  Jerusalem to Bethlehem.

In September 1964, Pope Paul received in audience the Rev. Theodore Hesburgh, then president of the University of Notre Dame, at the head of the International Federation of Catholic Universities. From this meeting and others over the next year and a half, the bishop of Rome entrusted the idea of Tantur to Notre Dame and a committee of international ecumenical advisors – including  Yves Congar, Oscar Cullman, Jean-Jacques von Allmen, Georges Florovsky, J. N. D. Kelly, Raymond Pannikar, Karekin Sarkissian, and several other great ecumenical theologians of the age. The board began its work in earnest in November 1965.

The Vatican purchased the 36 acres – then in Jordan – from the Sovereign Military Order of Malta for $300,000, and leased the property to the University of Notre Dame for 50 years, renewable. Groundbreaking took place on 4 June 1967. The Six-Day War began the next day, with the invasion of Israel by Egypt, Jordan, and Syria. Within a week, the property was under Israeli sovereignty.

Hesburgh had secured a donation for the construction costs from Mr. and Mrs. I. A. O’Shaughnessy of St. Paul, Minnesota. Due to difficulties of the Arab-Israeli conflict, construction was delayed for a short while, but Tantur was officially opened in September 1972, with an inaugural community of thirty scholars and their families, six Benedictine (Catholic) monks from Montserrat in Spain, and five international staff. In total, ten nationalities and thirteen religious identities were represented. Yves Congar, OP, was one of the first senior scholars to reside in community at Tantur.

In the mid-1980s there was increased interest among the churches in interreligious dialogue and in the ‘life and work’ aspect of ecumenism, especially in conflict resolution and peacebuilding. The First Intifada (1987-1991) resulted in a decreased interest in international scholars spending time in Jerusalem for research. As local tensions eased, the ecumenical movement entered what has been called its "ecumenical winter". 

During the 1990s, the University of Notre Dame used Tantur as a site for one of its international study-abroad programs, with a focus on theology and peace studies. During this time, much of the programming shifted from semester- or year-long research fellowships to shorter sabbatical and continuing education programs for pastoral leaders and educators from around the world.

The Second Intifada (2000-2005) led to a cessation of international travel to Jerusalem. The University of Notre Dame re-established its undergraduate study program in the early 2010s, as well as internships for a Masters in International Peace Studies. Tantur is also the university’s Jerusalem "Global Gateway": a kind of embassy of Notre Dame in the Holy Land.

Tantur has welcomed over 5,000 Anglican, Catholic, Orthodox, and Protestant scholars and program participants over the years.

Robert McAfee Brown explained the choice of Jerusalem as follows:
 It is the locus of many of the holiest sites of Christianity, but also of Judaism and Islam;
 A strident and humbling reminder of the ongoing divisions within Christianity (as a visit to the Holy Sepulcher makes cacophonously clear);
 Location of some of the deepest strife and division among world religions anywhere
 It sits at a crossroads between technologically developed west and emerging nations;
 All the major problems of the 20th century are present here: poverty, war, racism, hunger;
 In the midst of this remains symbol of hope, the vision of the New Jerusalem.

One of the early rectors of Tantur, Jean-Jacques von Allmen, noted additional benefits of an ecumenical research center in Jerusalem:
 The traditions of Eastern churches (Catholic and Orthodox) are the living tradition of the local church here, which would help move Catholics beyond a kind of Romano-Centrism and tendency toward Latinization;
 It challenges Protestants’ latent Docetism, attaching the geography of salvation to the history of salvation;
 Theology is here forced to take into account mystery of Israel;
 Likewise, it must take into account Islam, as well as Judaism, and its place in Gods design;
 This is the city from which the Gospel came and to which must return: here is both evangelism and eschatology.

Scholarly research and community
The core of Tantur’s mission and program is a community of doctoral and post-doctoral researchers working in areas related to its mission of promoting Christian unity (ecumenism). This particularly includes scripture studies, ecclesiology, patristics, and sacramental theology. Other scholars focus on the aspects of interreligious dialogue and peacebuilding.

Tantur was built to house up to a hundred individuals, including scholars and their families. Historically, though, at its largest the scholarly community has been no more than 30–40 individuals. In recent years, there are usually only 3–5 research fellows in residence at any given time.

Additional community members are drawn from participants in the sabbatical and continuing education programs, graduate and undergraduate students from the University of Notre Dame, ecumenical pilgrim groups, volunteers from church organizations, and participants in local programs and conferences.

All community members are invited to participate in a community evening on Sundays, including ecumenical evening prayer and dinner. Except for some of the study-abroad programs, most are offered full board and participate in daily common ecumenical prayer.

Continuing education programs
Several different sabbatical, continuing education, and accredited courses are offered to serve those seeking to deepen their understanding of the Land, its history, culture, and the faiths of the people here. They are primarily designed for Christian pastoral leaders (ordained or lay) from all communions and denominations, or academics and educators in a field of theology related to the mission of Tantur.

All of the programs take advantage of the experience of the Holy Land as the "fifth gospel", weaving classroom instruction with on-site excursions. Hebrew and Christian Scriptures, Biblical Geography and Archaeology, History of the Middle East, Christian Spirituality, Peace-building., and encounters with Judaism, Islam, and local Christian communities are integrated with visits to Christian holy sites and those important to the history of the Land. Programs often include visits around Jerusalem and Bethlehem, the Galilee, the Dead Sea, and the Negev. Longer programs include visits to the Western Wall and the Dome of the Rock; experience at a synagogue and Shabbat meal with a Jewish family; experience at a local Arabic Christian liturgy and meals with families, and the like.

A three-month sabbatical program is offered in the fall, and usually draws clergy, lay pastoral workers, and educators.

A three-week Easter Encounter program is organized around the Western Holy Week in Jerusalem, and includes liturgies or meetings at Catholic, Anglican, and Lutheran churches during that time. When the Gregorian and Julian dates for Easter coincide, Orthodox liturgies are included. 
One-month programs are offered during the summer months, usually in June and July.

An intensive four-week course in the summer is offered in Modern Hebrew specifically for academics who have already a knowledge of Biblical Hebrew.

Study-abroad programs
During the spring semester, undergraduate students of the University of Notre Dame are invited to come on a study abroad program at Tantur, with courses offered in Anthropology, Art History, Political History, International Peace Studies, Philosophy, Theology, and language studies in Hebrew or Arabic.

A three-week theology seminar is offered for undergraduates from any U.S. college or university, entitled, "Three Faiths, Two Peoples: Jews, Christians, and Muslims in the Holy Land."

Ecumenical pilgrims
Tantur is also a destination for university groups, ecumenical pilgrimage groups, retreats and academic conferences.

Campus and facilities

Tantur has 100,000 square feet in building space, on a campus of 36 acres. The architect, Francesco "Frank" Montana, was dedicated to using only local Jerusalem sandstone and local labor. He describes the effect, 
 "The pattern of the stones is irregular, with uneven contours on which light can play. The idea behind this was that the masonry should lead the eye out to the surrounding landscape of the desert of Judea, because there you have before you a complete geography of salvation, from the Old Testament to Jesus Christ. I planned many terraces on which people can meet and from which they can look towards Jerusalem, Bethlehem, and Beit Jala. On the terraces, you can watch the galloping clouds coming up from the sea, bringing a life-giving benediction to the far deserts, or you can feel the east wind scorching your face like the fire of the burning bush."

Library

The Tantur Ecumenical Research Library is one of the largest Christian theological libraries in the Holy Land and the Middle East, and one of the largest ecumenical libraries worldwide.
 
The library houses 65,000 volumes, with room for another 40,000. Its periodicals collection includes 400 journals, though a smaller number of these are current. The primary collection is in ecumenism and patristics, but there are strong collections in religions and interreligious dialogue (especially with Judaism and Islam),  biblical studies, church history, and international peace studies, with an emphasis on Arab-Israeli and Israel-Palestine questions. 
The library houses the collection of the Israel/Palestine Center for Research and Information (IPCRI), the periodicals of the Ecumenical Fraternity, and personal collections of former resident scholars such as Oscar Cullmann and Thomas Stransky.

The majority of texts are in English, French, and German, but with a number of titles in Spanish, Italian, Greek, Arabic, and Hebrew.

Chapels and prayer spaces
There are four primary places of community prayer at Tantur, though prayer and the practice of spiritual ecumenism is encouraged in all places at all hours:
 A large ecumenical chapel
 A medium interfaith meditation room
 A small oratory with the Blessed Sacrament reserved
 An outdoor shrine with an Icon of Christ Pantocrator and the New Jerusalem, written by Ian Knowles of the Bethlehem Icon School. 
 Forty acres of olive groves and a bit of nature.

Classrooms and meeting spaces
When built, the Tantur Auditorium was the largest of its kind in Jerusalem, with a capacity of 120 people.

Seminar rooms include the Bethlehem Room and Chapel Seminar Room, each with broad vistas and terraces of the surrounding villages, and a capacity for about thirty people. Small seminar rooms include the Notre Dame Room and Library Seminar Room, each ideal for about a dozen people. The Jerusalem Global Gateway building houses the Notre Dame study abroad classes, just southwest of the main facility.

Flora and fauna
Tantur’s hill is covered with about 500 olive trees, and is a home or oasis for a variety of local fauna: snakes, scorpions, bats, parrots, quail, lizards, geckos, feral cats and dogs, foxes, and a jackal.

Leadership

International advisory board
 Dr. R. Scott Appleby, Dean, Keough School of Global Affairs, Notre Dame
 Dr. J. Matthew Ashley, Chair, Department of Theology. Notre Dame
 Dr. Peter C. Bouteneff, Assoc. Prof. Systematic Theology, St. Vladimir’s Orthodox Theological Seminary
 Most Rev. Brian Farrell, Secretary, Pontifical Council for Promoting Christian Unity & Vice President, Commission for Religious, Relations with the Jews
 Rev. Patrick D. Gaffney, C.S.C. Department of Anthropology, Notre Dame
 Rev. John I. Jenkins, C.S.C. President, Notre Dame
 Rev. Nicholas Lossky, Professor Emeritus, St. Sergius Orthodox Theological Academy
 Rev. James E. McDonald, C.S.C., Assoc. Vice President, Counselor to the President, Notre Dame
 Mr. John A. Sejdinaj Vice President for Finance, Notre Dame
 Prof. Dr. Wolfgang Thönissen, Leitender Direktor, Johann-Adam-Möhler-Institut
 Rev. Richard V. Warner, C.S.C. Superior General of the Congregation of Holy Cross
 Most Rev. John Went, Bishop of Tewkesbury

Staff
 Rev. John M. Paul, SJ, Rector
 Rev. Khaled Anatolios, Senior Ecumenical Fellow
 Nizar Halloun, Program Director
 Daniel Schwake, Executive Director, UND Jerusalem Global Gateway

Past rectors
 Paul S. Minear (1971-1972)*
 Rev. Msgr. Charles Moeller (1972-1973)
 Rev. Jean-Jacques von Allmen (1973-1974)
 Walter Wegner (1974-1977)
 Walter Harrelson (1977-1979)
 Most Rev. Joseph Blenkinsopp (Fall 1978) *
 Georges MacRae (1979-1980)
 Rev. David Burrell, CSC (1980-1981)
 Donald Nicholl (1981-1985)
 Landrum Bolling (1985-1988)
 Rev. Thomas Stransky (1988-1999)
 Rev. Michael McGarry (1999-2010)
 Rev. Timothy Lowe (2010-2013)
 Anthony Pohlen (2013-2014)*
 Rev. Russell McDougall, CSC (2014–2020)

* Indicates interim administrators/acting rectors in the absence of a Rector

Past vice-rectors
 Jean-Jacques von Allmen (1972-1973)
 Chrysostome Zaphiris (1972-1974)
 Rev. Pierre Benoit (1973-1974)
 Robert O’Donnell (1987-1991)
 Sr. Sheilagh Philips (1991-1994)
 Bengt Holmberg (1996-1998)
 Knud Jeppsen (1998-2004)
 Sr. Bridget Tighe (2006-2011)

Notable alumni
 Pierre Benoit
 Landrum Bolling
 Frans Bouwen, MAfr.
 Andrew "A.J." Boyd
 David Burrell, CSC
 Yves Congar, OP
 Oscar Cullmann
 Godfrey Diekmann, O.S.B.
 Moshe Greenberg
 Bede Griffiths, OSB Cam.
 Judith Lieu
 George Lindbeck
 Raanan Mallek
 Charles Moeller
 Donald Nicholl
 Nikos Nissiotis
 Raimon Panikkar
 Timothy B. Sailors
 James A. Sanders
 Charles E. Sheedy
 Kirsten Skydsgaard
 John Howard Yoder
 Chrysostomus (Gerasimos) Zaphiris

Bibliography
Cullmann, Oscar. "Un’opera di riconciliazione a Gerusalemme: L’Istituto Ecumenico di Ricerche Teologiche". Aldo Moda, trans. In Studia Patavina: Rivista di Scienze Religiose, Vol. 20, No. 1, 1973: 54-69.
 Cunningham, Lawrence, ed. Ecumenism: Present Realities and Future Prospects. Notre Dame, 1999.
 Daley, Brian E. A Wider History of Salvation? Tantur’s Mission after Fifty Years. Unpublished. Presented in Jerusalem: Tantur, 8 January 2015.
  Jaeger, D.-M. A., ed. Tantur Papers on Christianity in the Holy Land. Studia Oecumenica Hierosolymitana No.1. Jerusalem: Franciscan Printing Press, 1981.
 Lowe, Timothy, ed. Hope of Unity:Living Ecumenism Today. Jerusalem, 2013.
Mayhead, Dom John. "A Journey of Reconciliation with the Tantur Ecumenical Institute: 11 March-11 April 2008" in One in Christ, Vol. 42, No. 1 (Summer 2008): 187-200. 
Stransky, Thomas F., CSP. "Tantur Ecumenical Institute," in Dictionary of the Ecumenical Movement.
 Witton Davies, C. "Tantur: An Ecumenical Centre in the Holy Land" in The Tablet, 14 June 1975.
Guasco, Alberto. L'Istituto ecumenico di Tantur (1963-1978). Appunti e problemi per una storia, "Cristianesimo nella storia", 1 (2017), pp. 221–246

References

External links
Tantur Ecumenical Institute
Notre Dame Study Abroad in Jerusalem
The British Trust for Tantur
French Association for Tantur/Unité des Chrétiens

Christian ecumenical organizations
Anglican ecumenism
Catholic Church and ecumenism
Eastern Orthodox ecumenical and interfaith relations
Catholic universities and colleges
University of Notre Dame
Catholicism in Israel
Educational institutions established in 1972
1972 establishments in Israel